Ben Donaldson (born in Australia) is an Australian rugby union player who plays for the New South Wales Waratahs in Super Rugby. His playing position is Fly-half. He plays for the Waratahs in the Super Rugby and the Australian rugby union team, the Wallabies.

International career

Donaldson made his debut for the Wallabies on the 13th of November 2022 during the Autumn Nations Cup when he was substituted on for Noah Lolesio in the 75th minute of the third round game against Italy. The Wallabies lost the game 28 to 27. Donaldson returned to the side in the 5th round of the tour against Wales national rugby union team where he started at fly-half converting two penalties and scoring a conversion helping lead the Australians to a 39 to 34 win over Wales.

Reference list

External links
Rugby.com.au profile
itsrugby.co.uk profile

Australian rugby union players
Living people
Rugby union fly-halves
1999 births
Rugby union fullbacks
Sydney (NRC team) players
New South Wales Waratahs players
Australia international rugby union players